Iranica may refer to:
Encyclopædia Iranica, an encyclopedia about the history, culture, and civilization of Iranian peoples
Scientia Iranica, an international journal of science and technology
Acta Iranica, a periodical on Iranian Studies